Pingyuan Jun may refer to:

Lord Pingyuan (died 251 BC), politician and nobleman of Zhao
Pingyuan Commandery, a historical commandery from the Han to Tang dynasties